The discography of the Mexican singer Fey consists of six studio albums, one tribute album, eleven collections, one box set, an album format VHS and published over thirty singles in several countries. Sony Music, a subsidiary in Mexico released her first single "Media naranja" in 1995, becoming an instant success. The publication of her second album was given to know in the U.S. and Spain. Her next publication consolidate her success and expand her popularity to other countries around the world.

By 2002, Fey published Vértigo. Fey experimented new rhythms with electronic and industrial music. The low promotion around the world makes have low sales. By 2004 with a new record company EMI Music released two albums that were not commercial but managed to keep in the music scene. Again the low promotion made that this time the singer leave the label in search of new musical collaborators.

By 2008, Fey signed a contract with an independent label, the following year published Dulce Tentación and return to the tops in Mexico and Latin America, after almost five years.

In this 2012, Fey signed a new contract with the first label to promote her eighth album. Currently estimated sales of their products all in more than twenty million copies worldwide.

Albums

Studio albums

Compilation albums

EP

Live album

Singles

Music videos

Tribute album

References

Discographies of Mexican artists
Latin pop music discographies